Mission Allahu Akbar is an upcoming Pakistani Urdu language romantic drama film directed by Shaan Shahid It stars, Shaan and Humaima Malick. The shooting will start after Muharram. It is the remake of an old Pakistani film Masakali. It will be shot in Thailand.

Casting 
Shaan Shahid first cast Juggan Kazim but later on he cast Humaima Malick who first appeared in Bol and won international awards and recognition.

Cast 
Shaan Shahid
 Humaima Malick

References 

Unreleased Pakistani films
Pakistani romantic drama films
Lollywood films
Remakes of Pakistani films
Urdu-language Pakistani films